The 1994–95 season was the 86th season in the existence of Borussia Dortmund and the club's 19th consecutive season in the top flight of German football. In addition to the domestic league, Borussia Dortmund participated in this season's edition of the DFB-Pokal and the UEFA Cup.

This season was marked by a high level of excitement until the last rounds as Dortmund remained on top until round 28, losing it to Bremen who held it until the last round when they lost to Bayern 3–1. Dortmund won the league trophy for the first time in its current version and fourth overall.

Players

First-team squad

Transfers

In

Out

Competitions

Overall record

Bundesliga

League table

Results summary

Results by round

Matches 

Source:

DFB-Pokal

UEFA Cup

First round

Second round

Third round

Quarter-finals

Semi-finals

Statistics

Goalscorers

References

Borussia Dortmund seasons
Borussia Dortmund
German football championship-winning seasons